The 2022 Holiday Bash was the third annual Holiday Bash professional wrestling Christmas television special produced by All Elite Wrestling (AEW). It took place on December 21, 2022, at the Freeman Coliseum in San Antonio, Texas. The two-part event was broadcast as special episodes of AEW's weekly television programs, Wednesday Night Dynamite and Friday Night Rampage. Dynamite aired live on TBS while Rampage aired on tape delay on December 23 on TNT.

Production

Background
Holiday Bash is an annual Christmas television special produced by All Elite Wrestling (AEW) since 2020. While the original event only aired as a special episode of AEW's flagship program, Wednesday Night Dynamite, the 2021 event expanded it to a two-part event, with the second part airing as a special episode of Rampage, which aired on Saturday instead of its usual Friday. On October 12, 2022, it was announced that the third Holiday Bash would take place on December 21 at the Freeman Coliseum in San Antonio, Texas. Dynamite aired live on TBS while Rampage aired on tape delay on Friday, December 23 on TNT.

Storylines
Holiday Bash featured professional wrestling matches that involved different wrestlers from pre-existing scripted feuds and storylines. Wrestlers portrayed heroes, villains, or less distinguishable characters in scripted events that built tension and culminated in a wrestling match or series of matches. Storylines were produced on AEW's weekly television programs, Dynamite and Rampage, the supplementary online streaming shows, Dark and Elevation, and The Young Bucks' YouTube series Being The Elite.

At Full Gear, Death Triangle (Pac, Penta El Zero Miedo, and Rey Fénix) defeated The Elite (Kenny Omega, Matt Jackson, and Nick Jackson) to retain the AEW World Trios Championship. Afterwards, it was announced that the Full Gear match was the first in a Best of Seven Series for the championship. Death Triangle would again defeat The Elite on the following episode of Dynamite, but The Elite gained a win on the next week's episode. At Winter Is Coming, Death Triangle secured another win to lead the series at 3–1. The fifth match in the series was scheduled for Dynamite: Holiday Bash as a No Disqualification match.

Aftermath
With The Elite's (Kenny Omega, Matt Jackson, and Nick Jackson) win over Death Triangle (Pac, Penta El Zero Miedo, and Rey Fénix), it brought the series to 3–2, with the sixth match scheduled for Dynamite: New Year's Smash as a Falls Count Anywhere match.

Results

Notes

References

External links

2022
2020s American television specials
2022 American television episodes
2022 in professional wrestling
December 2022 events in the United States
2022 in Texas
Events in San Antonio
Professional wrestling in Texas
Holidays themed professional wrestling events